HoZac Records is a record label formed in Chicago, Illinois, United States in late 2006 by Todd Killings and Brett Cross after the demise of Horizontal Action Magazine (1997–2005).  Concentrating on releasing records from musicians of the underground rock 'n' roll world, HoZac started off with 7" singles for the first two years and released their first LP by The Smith Westerns.

References

External links
official site
Interview with Todd Novak of Hozac Records

American record labels